The 2018 BWF World Championships was a badminton tournament which was held from 30 July to 5 August at Nanjing Youth Olympic Games Sports Park Arena in Nanjing, China.

Host city selection
Nanjing was the only bidder for 2018 edition of championships. The bid was approved by Badminton World Federation during council meeting in Kuala Lumpur, Malaysia.

Schedule
Five events were held.

All times are local (UTC+8).

Players

357 players from 48 countries in total participate in this game.

  (2)
  (1)
  (1)
  (3)
  (1)
  (8)
  (7)
  (25)
  (23)
  (1)
  (4)
  (17)
  (4)
  (10)
  (1)
  (2)
  (10)
  (16)
  (14)
  (1)
  (25)
  (29)
  (3)
  (1)
  (3)
  (25)
  (2)
  (18)
  (2)
  (11)
  (1)
  (2)
  (2)
  (2)
  (3)
  (1)
  (14)
  (3)
  (1)
  (6)
  (4)
  (1)
  (3)
  (18)
  (5)
  (4)
  (8)
  (9)

Medal summary

Medal table

Medalists

International broadcasters

References

External links
Official website
BWF website

 
2018
World Championships
BWF World Championships
2018 BWF World Championships
BWF World Championships
BWF World Championships
Sport in Nanjing